The Fourth National Assembly at Argos was a Greek convention which sat at Argos from 11 July to 6 August 1829, during the Greek War of Independence.

The Fourth National Assembly followed on from the Third National Assembly at Troezen (1827), which had adopted a new constitution selected Ioannis Kapodistrias as Governor of Greece with extensive powers for a seven-year term. The Assembly counted 236 representatives from all over Greece (including territories, such as Crete or Macedonia, that were still under Ottoman control), for the first time elected via suffrage.

The Assembly adopted a series of reforms suggested by Kapodistrias, most notably:
 the replacement of the Panellinion advisory council with a 27-member Senate
 the adoption of the phoenix as the country's currency

Members of the National Assembly

1829 in Greece
1829 elections in Europe
Elections in Greece
4th
History of Argos, Peloponnese
July 1829 events
August 1829 events
Ioannis Kapodistrias